Hibbertia rhynchocalyx is a species of flowering plant in the family Dilleniaceae and is endemic to the Gibraltar Range National Park in eastern Australia. It is a low shrub with hairy foliage, oblong leaves and yellow flowers with twelve stamens joined at the base on one side of two hairy carpels.

Description
Hibbertia rhynchocalyx is a low shrub with spreading, hairy branches. Flowering mostly occurs in October.

Taxonomy
Hibbertia rhynchocalyx was first formally described in 1998 by Hellmut R. Toelken in the Journal of the Adelaide Botanic Gardens from specimens collected by John Beaumont Williams and Keith Winterhalder in the Gibraltar Range National Park.

Distribution and habitat
This hibbertia grows on east-facing slopes, usually in Eucalyptus resinifera forest, in the Gibraltar National Park in north-eastern New South Wales.

See also
List of Hibbertia species

References

rhynchocalyx
Flora of New South Wales
Plants described in 1998
Taxa named by Hellmut R. Toelken